Broxton may refer to:

 Broxton, Cheshire, England
 Broxton, Oklahoma, United States
 Broxton, Georgia, United States
 Jonathan Broxton (born 1984), baseball player
 Broxton (system on chip), code name for an Intel Atom system on chip platform